Debraj Ray (born 3 September 1957) is an Indian-American economist, who is currently teaching and working at New York University. His research interests focus on development economics and game theory, and was the Co-editor of American Economic Review.

Ray is Julius Silver Professor in the Faculty of Arts and Science, and the Professor of Economics at New York University since 1999. At the same time, he is a Part-Time Professor at University of Warwick. Ray is a council member of Game Theory Society and he is also a board member in the Economic Analysis of Development (BREAD) and Theoretical Research in Development Economics (ThReD).

Education
Debraj Ray graduated from University of Calcutta, where he earned a B.A. in Economics in 1977. After that, Ray obtained a M.A. (1981) and a Ph.D. (1983) both from Cornell University, where his doctoral supervisor was Mukul Majumdar. The title of his Essays in Intertemporal Economics.

Academic career
Prior to joining NYU, Ray held academic positions at Stanford University, the Indian Statistical Institute, and at Boston University, where he was Director of the Institute for Economic Development. He has held visiting appointments at Harvard University, MIT, the Instituto Nacional de Matemática Pura e Aplicada in Rio de Janeiro, Brazil, the People's University of China in Beijing, the London School of Economics, Columbia University, and the Instituto de Análisis Económico in Barcelona. He is a part-time professor at the University of Warwick.

Professional affiliations and awards
Ray is a Fellow of the American Academy of Arts and Sciences, the  Econometric Society, a Guggenheim Fellow, a recipient of the Mahalanobis Memorial Medal, and a recipient of the Outstanding Young Scientists Award in mathematics from the Indian National Science Academy. He received the Dean's Award for Distinguished Teaching from Stanford University and the Gittner Award for Teaching Excellence in Economics from Boston University. He was awarded a Doctor Philosophiae Honoris Causa from the University of Oslo.

Ray has served on the editorial board of Econometrica, the Journal of Economic Theory, the Journal of Development Economics, the Journal of Economic Growth, the Japanese Economic Review, Games and Economic Behavior, American Economic Journal Microeconomics. He has served as a Foreign Editor of the Review of Economic Studies, and as Co-editor of the Econometric Society journal, Theoretical Economics.

Ray has received many teaching rewards from universities around the world and other honorary rewards from different institutions.
 Mahalanobis Memorial Medal of the Indian Econometric Society, 1989
 Fellow of the Econometric Society, 1993
 Gittner Teaching Award from Boston University, 1996
 Guggenheim Fellow, 1997
 Dean’s Award for Distinguished Teaching from Stanford University, 1985
 Fellowship by the American Academy of Arts and Sciences, 2016
 Doctor Philosophiae Honoris Causa from University of Oslo, 2011
 Fellowship by the Society for the Advancement of Economic Theory, 2011
 Golden Dozen Teaching Award for excellence in undergraduate teaching from New York University, 2017

Bibliography

Books

Journal articles

Notes

External links 
 Debraj Ray's homepage at New York University

1957 births
University of Calcutta alumni
Cornell University alumni
Harvard University staff
Indian development economists
Game theorists
Fellows of the Econometric Society
20th-century Indian economists
21st-century American economists
Living people
New York University faculty
American academics of Indian descent
21st-century Indian economists
Scientists from Kolkata
Scholars from Kolkata
Fellows of the American Academy of Arts and Sciences
Indian economists